Lightning Strikes is a studio album by American rapper Aceyalone. It was released on Decon in 2007. The production is handled by Bionik.

Critical reception
Nate Patrin of Pitchfork gave the album a 5.5 out of 10, saying, "The problem is that, even with Aceyalone's lyrical style toned down a little, the attempted merging of underground rap and pop-reggae makes Lightning Strikes sort of a mess, even if it's the kind of mess where half the tracks are fairly likable." Scott Thill of XLR8R gave the album a 7 out of 10, saying, "Yes, anything from Acey is worth your cash, but I can't wait until he goes retro with analog drums on reel-to-reel."

Track listing

References

External links
 

2007 albums
Aceyalone albums
Decon albums